The Lift (Dutch: De Lift) is a 1983 Dutch science-fiction horror film directed and written by Dick Maas. The plot concerns an elevator that mysteriously begins to function intelligently on its own, where victims who go near the elevator or use it are killed.

An American remake also directed by Dick Maas titled Down was released in 2001.

Plot
In a building in Amsterdam, an elevator inexplicably begins to function alone. After a lightning storm causes a power failure and traps four people in the elevator, the elevator fails to open even after a subsequent power restore, and the passengers almost suffocate. Soon, subsequent malfunctions prove fatal as an elderly blind man falls to his death when the elevator doors open to an empty shaft, the building night watchman is decapitated, and a janitor is seemingly burned alive.

Felix Adelaar (Huub Stapel), a technician from the elevator company Deta Liften, begins to examine the electrical system in an attempt to find any anomalies. During the course of several inspections, he meets Mieke de Beer (Willeke van Ammelrooy), a journalist for De Nieuwe Revu, a local tabloid. When inspections reveal no apparent problems with the electrical system, Felix becomes obsessed with the continuing malfunctions of the elevator; this has a negative impact on his marriage as his wife Saskia (Josine van Dalsum) begins to suspect he is having an affair. When Felix pays yet another visit to the building, he notices a van parked outside from Rising Sun, a manufacturer of microprocessors for automation and a secret supplier of experimental microprocessors to Deta Liften. Felix and Mieke, after collecting newspaper clippings about Rising Sun, try to meet with the company's CEO, who acts nervous and answers abruptly.

Mieke invites Felix to meet up with her former university professor who specializes in electronics. The professor explains microprocessors' sensitivity to external factors, such as electric fields, magnetic fields, and radioactivity, which undermine the proper functionality. He tells about a computer built years ago which suddenly began to self-program and went out of control. The next morning, Felix's boss angrily suspends him for his unauthorized visit to Rising Sun. That evening, the owners of Deta Liften and Rising Sun meet to discuss how to stop the elevator's computer processor, which is built from organic material, from killing people.

Saskia leaves Felix, taking their children with her. With nothing left to lose, Felix goes to the building to solve the elevator mystery. He discovers that the elevator has a sentient mind when it tries to prevent him from accessing its microprocessor. Instead Felix climbs into the elevator shaft and finds a pulsating box; inside is sticky goo covering a silicon chip—the elevator's heart. As Felix attacks the box with a wrench, the elevator uses its counterweight to knock him off balance. He manages to land on a ledge just below the elevator doors, and is rescued by Mieke just before the elevator is able to crush him.

As Rising Sun's CEO arrives to see that his experiment failed, he pulls out a pistol and fires into the biocomputer to seemingly kill it. The computer then shoots one of the broken cables out to drag him inside the shaft and hangs him. As a shaken Felix and Mieke walk down the stairs the elevator's heartbeat continues.

Cast
 Huub Stapel as Felix Adelaar
 Willeke van Ammelrooy as Mieke de Beer
 Josine van Dalsum as Saskia Adelaar

Critical response

Critical reception for De Lift has been mixed: some commended the film for its blending of humor and suspense, while others criticized its execution.
Variety in particular praised the film, writing, "Humor from charcoal gray to pitch black, fine suspense, murders and thrills, and all of it without gratuitous gore combine for a jaunty entertainment in The Lift, director Dick Maas’ first theatrical test, which he passes handsomely." Dennis Schwartz from Ozus' World Movie Reviews rated the film a grade B−, stating that the film was "Played more for a black comedy than for a corporate greed or menace film."

Janet Maslin of The New York Times was highly critical of the film, calling it "remarkably tension-free", and criticized its execution as being "too tepid". Maslin further stated, "In the hands of the right film maker, of course, even a toaster can be terrifying. But Mr. Maas leaves the elevator's potential fiendishness largely unexploited." Time Out London gave the film a negative review, writing "the movie is shafted by confusions of script and execution, neither of which match up to the original good idea." TV Guide awarded the film a mixed two out of five stars, stating that the film was "Surprisingly effective", while also stating that it was not particularly scary.

References

External links 
 
 
 
 

1983 films
1983 horror films
1980s science fiction horror films
Dutch science fiction horror films
1980s Dutch-language films
Films set in Amsterdam
Films directed by Dick Maas
Films set in elevators
Techno-horror films